Conservation Genetics is a bimonthly peer-reviewed scientific journal covering all areas of conservation genetics. It was established in 2000 and is published by Springer Science+Business Media. The editor-in-chief is A. Rus Hoelzel (University of Durham). According to the Journal Citation Reports, the journal has a 2021 impact factor of 3.092.

See also
Conservation Genetics Resources

References

External links

Genetics journals
English-language journals
Springer Science+Business Media academic journals
Publications established in 2000
Bimonthly journals